Kentucky Flat is a former settlement in Nevada County, California. Dating to 1850, it was first mined by settlers from the U.S. state of Kentucky. Several valuable quartz leads were discovered in the area, and the diggings were worked with significant profit. In that year, it was considered to be a settlement of importance, crowded with miners, along with Rich Flat, Randolph Flat, Texas Flat, Newtown, Bridgeport, Indian Flat, Anthony House, Gass Flat, and Lander's Bar. The Kentucky Flat Schoolhouse might be the "oldest continuously used one-room schoolhouse in California".

References

Attribution
 
 

Former settlements in Nevada County, California
Former populated places in California